Fall in Love with Me is a 2014 Taiwanese television series created by Sanlih E-Television, starring Aaron Yan of Fahrenheit and Tia Lee of Dream Girls as the main cast. The Chinese title of the drama literally translates as "Fall in Love with Two of Me". Filming began on February 28, 2014. The series began airing on TTV channel on Sunday nights at 10:00 PM starting on April 6, 2014 and took over the time slot of previous TTV drama "Deja Vu 回到愛以前". The drama was aired as it was being filmed.

At the 3rd Sanlih Drama Awards on December 14, 2014, Aaron Yan received the Best Actor award and the series was awarded the "Viewers Choice Drama". It was also voted as the "Best Chinese Language Drama of the Year" at the 3rd Annual DramaFever Awards.

Synopsis
Lu Tian Xing (Aaron Yan) is a prodigy in Asia's advertising field. Rich, famous, and highly successful, he suddenly announces during a press conference that he will be taking a three-month break from the advertising life. With a simple disguise, he transforms himself into "Xiao Lu". Enter Tao Le Si (Tia Lee), a young woman who promised her late brother to protect his advertisement agency and his legacy. Unfortunately, business never picks up and Le Si had to battle with Tian Xing to stop her company from being sold. When Xiao Lu enters her office doors, Le Si initially thinks that he's Tian Xing, but the two men's personalities are complete opposites. Le Si finds herself drawn to Xiao Lu's warm temperament, but will their love last once she discovers the truth of his identity?

Cast

Main cast
Aaron Yan 炎亞綸 as Lu Tian Xing 路天行 (Episodes 01 - 20)/Xiao Lu 小鹿 (Episodes 01 - 11, 20)
Lu Tian Xing (Episodes 01- 20) - Lu Tian Xing has been named the 21st century prodigy of the marketing industry. He has a creative mind that is able to come up with award winning creations and marketing ideas. One day he realizes that he has lost his sense of creativity and decides to take a three-month vacation from work in order to find his inspiration again. He disguises himself as Xiao Lu and enters the OZ company to become an employee.
Xiao Lu (Episodes 01 - 11, 20) - Lu Tian Xing's alter ego. He enters the OZ company as Xiao Lu and forms a close bond with his co-workers, particularly his boss, Tao Le Si.
Tia Lee 李毓芬 as Tao Le Si 陶樂思
Tao Le Si tries to stay afloat by managing her late brother's advertising company OZ. She is a hard worker who is always optimistic. Despite her hard work, she finds it difficult to run the company as she continues to lose customers to the point where she can barely pay her workers/friends. One day, during heavy traffic, she meets Lu Tian Xing, who later arrives at her house offering to buy OZ. Due to this offer, she automatically assumes that Lu Tian Xing is a coldhearted man with evil intentions, thus having a bad first impression of him. She has no idea that Xiao Lu is Lu Tian Xing in disguise when he comes to work for her company.

Supporting Cast 
Jack Li 李運慶 as Leo 翁立洋
Works at OZ as the creative director of advertising. He is a very loyal and serious person. People who don't know him describe him as a person who has a cold robotic personality. Only his colleagues know the real him and see him as a big brother. He is very close to Tao Le Si which causes him confusion on how he really feels about her.
Katherine Wang 王凱蒂 as Xu Miao Miao 徐妙妙
Works at OZ as a creative visual designer and has been Tao Le Si's best friend since college. She has a playful and active personality and often acts like a teenage girl. She likes to use her designs and drawings to express her inner thoughts and emotions.

Other cast
 黃懷晨 as Wang Ting Wei 王廷威
Works at Tian Ji Advertising Company as an executive assistant. 
Hope Lin 林可彤 as Helen Cao Hai Lun 曹海倫
Works at Tian Ji Advertising Company as an executive secretary. 
Beatrice Fang 方志友 as Li Huan Huan 李歡歡
Tian Xings's childhood friend who is in love with him.
Kao Ying Hsuan 高英軒 as Li Qi Xuan / Lance 李奇軒
Tian Ji Advertising's Chief Operations Officer and Huan Huan's older brother.
Chen Bor-jeng 陳博正 as Fu Bo 福伯
Tian Xing's butler as well as a servant to the Li family.
Alixia Kim as Asa Xa
Tian Xing's personal maid who previously worked in a special maid latte cafe in Japan. 
Jian Chang 檢場 as Tao De Li 陶得力
Tao Le Si's father who is a Chinese herbal medicine specialist. 
Xie Qiong Nuan 謝瓊煖 as Hong Xiu Luan 洪秀鑾
Tao Le Si's mother who is a chiropractor.
Evan Yo 蔡旻佑 as Tao Le Yuan 陶樂源
Tao Le Si's older brother and the founder of OZ Advertising Company.
Yang Ming Wei 楊銘威 as Jia Gai Xian 賈蓋先
Works at OZ as an assistant director.

Soundtrack
Opening Theme
1/2 二分之一 by Aaron Yan 炎亞綸 feat. G.NA
Ending Theme
This Is Not Me 這不是我 by Aaron Yan 炎亞綸
Insert Songs
The Unwanted Love 多餘的我 by Aaron Yan 炎亞綸
No Rules 沒規矩 by Aaron Yan 炎亞綸
The Only Rose 唯一的玫瑰 by Aaron Yan 炎亞綸
Taipei Dreamin 台北沉睡了 by Aaron Yan 炎亞綸
Melted 融化了 by Popu Lady
The Happiness Is Just Enough 這樣的幸福剛剛好 by Popu Lady
The Warmth in the Pocket 口袋的溫度 by Hebe 田馥甄

Broadcast

Episode ratings

Awards and nominations

References

External links
SETTV Official website
SET Official website 
Official Facebook page 

Taiwanese drama television series
Taiwan Television original programming
2014 Taiwanese television series debuts
2014 Taiwanese television series endings
Sanlih E-Television original programming
Taiwanese romance television series